Rising Sun High School is a public high school in Rising Sun, Indiana. It is part of Rising Sun-Ohio County Community Schools and is the only high school in Ohio County.

Athletics
The nickname is the Shiners, and the athletic teams compete in the Ohio River Valley Conference.  The school has achieved some interscholastic success, as the Girls' Basketball team was the Class A runner-up in the state in 2000, and the Shiner Pride marching band reached the ISSMA Class D state finals in 1997 and 1998. The band also reached finals in the MSBA(Mid-States Band Association) in 2009. The Rising Sun Shiner Pride Marching Band placed 8th in Finals at the Mid States Band Association Finals in 2011 with their show entitled "Games People Play." In 2012 they placed 5th with their show entitled "It's a Jazz Thing."

See also
 List of high schools in Indiana

References
http://risingsunschools.com/media/FORMS/Faculty%20ADMIN.htm

External links
 Official Website

Buildings and structures in Ohio County, Indiana
Public high schools in Indiana
Education in Ohio County, Indiana